Mieczysław Ludwik Boruta-Spiechowicz (20 February 1894, in Rzeszów – 13 October 1985, in Zakopane) was a Polish military officer, a general of the Polish Army and a notable member of the post-war anti-communist opposition in Poland.

He joined the army in 1914 and served at various posts within the Polish Legions. After Poland regained her independence in 1918 he remained in active service and took part in both the Polish-Ukrainian War and the Battle of Lwów, in which he commanded a separate defence line, and later a Lwów Infantry Regiment formed out of local volunteers. Dispatched to France, he became the commander of two regiments of the Blue Army, with which he returned to Poland in 1919. During the Polish-Bolshevik War he distinguished himself as a skilled commander of the Polish mountain infantry units, of which he formed a regiment and commanded it on various fronts of the conflict. 

After the war he was sent to the Higher War School in Warsaw and received professional military training. He served at various commanding posts in a number of Polish infantry units, both standard and mountain. He was also a notable military theorist and writer of several books on the history and practice of warfare. During the Invasion of Poland he served as the commanding officer of the Boruta Operational Group, a part of the Kraków Army. Taken prisoner by the USSR, he was held in various Gulags and NKVD prisons until set free by the Sikorski-Mayski Agreement of 1941. He then joined the Anders' Polish Army in the East and became the commanding officer of the newly formed Polish 5th Infantry Division. He spent the rest of World War II as the commander of the Polish 1st Armoured Corps, combining the Polish 1st Armoured Division and the Polish Independent Parachute Brigade.

As one of the very few Polish pre-war generals to return to Communist-held Poland in 1945, he was initially accepted into the Polish Army. However, following a conflict with Karol Świerczewski he was demobilized and retired. He settled in Zakopane, where he became a farmer. He also remained an active member of the anti-communist opposition in Poland and in 1977 became one of the founding members of the ROPCiO movement.

Honours and awards
 Silver Cross of the Order of Virtuti Militari
 Officer's Cross of the Order of Polonia Restituta
 Cross of Independence with Swords
 Cross of Valour (seven times)
 Gold Cross of Merit

Bibliography
 Tadeusz Krawczak. Pro fide et patria: generał Mieczysław Boruta-Spiechowicz. Szczecin: "Pogranicze". 2004 
 Wojciech Grobelski - Generał brygady Ludwik Mieczysław Boruta-Spiechowicz (1894-1985), Warszawa, 2010 
 Zbigniew Mierzwiński: Generałowie II Rzeczypospolitej. Warszawa 1990: Wydawnictwo Polonia, s. 53-58. .
 Tadeusz Jurga: Obrona Polski 1939. Warszawa: Instytut Wydawniczy PAX, 1990, s. 753-754. .

1894 births
1985 deaths
People from Rzeszów
People from the Kingdom of Galicia and Lodomeria
Polish Austro-Hungarians
Polish generals of the Second Polish Republic
Polish Rifle Squads members
Polish Military Organisation members
Polish legionnaires (World War I)
Blue Army (Poland) personnel
Polish people of the Polish–Soviet War
Polish people of the Polish–Ukrainian War
People of the Polish May Coup (pro-government side)
Polish military personnel of World War II
Recipients of the Silver Cross of the Virtuti Militari
Recipients of the Cross of Independence with Swords
Officers of the Order of Polonia Restituta
Recipients of the Cross of Valour (Poland)
Recipients of the Gold Cross of Merit (Poland)